Antoine-Louis-Marie de Gramont, 8th Duke of Gramont (17 August 1755 – 28 August 1836), was a French military officer, diplomat and parliamentarian.

Life and career
He was known by the courtesy title of comte de Louvigny before his marriage, on 16 April 1780, to Aglaé de Polignac (1768–1803), daughter of Yolande de Polastron, Duchess of Polignac. At that point, he was accorded the style of duc de Guiche, since he was the heir presumptive to the Dukedom of Gramont. In 1801, he succeeded a cousin as the 8th Duke of Gramont and the Prince of Bidache.

He served as a captain in the Royal Garde du Corps before fleeing to Britain at the outset of the French Revolution. He remained loyal to the House of Bourbon, becoming a military commander under Louis Antoine, Duke of Angoulême. He later served briefly as French ambassador to the Court of St James's under the Bourbon Restoration.

See also
 Château de Bidache
 Duke of Gramont
 List of ambassadors of France to the United Kingdom

References

1755 births
1836 deaths
People from Versailles
People from Gironde
People of the Bourbon Restoration
Ambassadors of France to the United Kingdom
Peers of France
Antoine 8
French generals
18th-century French people
19th-century French diplomats
Nobility of the First French Empire
Grand Crosses of the Order of Saint Louis
Grand Officiers of the Légion d'honneur
Members of the Chamber of Peers of the Bourbon Restoration
Knights of Malta
French princes

Dukes of Guiche